Marvin L. Abney (born November 10, 1949 in Texarkana, Texas) is an American politician and a Democratic member of the Rhode Island House of Representatives representing District 73 since January 1, 2013. During the legislative session beginning in 2015, Abney was one of three African-Americans in the Rhode Island Legislature. Representative Abney is the current Chairman of the House Finance Committee.

Education
Abney earned his bachelor's degree in public administration from Stephen F. Austin State University (1975), his Master's degree in management from Webster University (1982), attended the United States Army Command and General Staff College in Munich, Germany (late 1980s), and earned his MBA from the University of Rhode Island (2000).

Elections
 2012 When District 73 Democratic Representative J. Russell Jackson retired and left the seat open, Abney ran in the September 11, 2012 Democratic Primary, winning with 612 votes (70.1%) and was unopposed for the November 6, 2012 General election, winning with 3,697 votes.

References

External links
 Official page at the Rhode Island General Assembly
 
 Marvin Abney at Ballotpedia
 Marvin L. Abney at the National Institute on Money in State Politics

1949 births
Living people
African-American state legislators in Rhode Island
Democratic Party members of the Rhode Island House of Representatives
Politicians from Newport, Rhode Island
People from Texarkana, Texas
Stephen F. Austin State University alumni
United States Army Command and General Staff College alumni
United States Army officers
2012 United States presidential electors
University of Rhode Island alumni
Webster University alumni
21st-century American politicians
21st-century African-American politicians
20th-century African-American people
Military personnel from Texas